Feat. Ai (stylized FEAT. A.I.) is the second compilation album by Japanese–American singer-songwriter Ai, released December 1, 2004, by Island Records and Universal Sigma. The compilation was Ai's first release under Island Records and contains a variety of songs that have her as a featured artist.

Upon the album's release, Feat. Ai peaked at number 33 on the Oricon Albums chart and number 79 on Taiwan's G-Music chart.

Background and release 
With the success of 2004 Ai, Ai's former label, BMG released a compilation album in September 2004 of unreleased material and remixes titled Flashback to Ai. Material from the compilation were from Ai's 2001 debut album, My Name Is Ai. Within a few weeks after the release of Flashback to Ai, Universal Japan announced Ai signed to Island Records after her contract with Def Jam Japan expired. A compilation album was announced to be released in December.

Critical reception 
CDJournal gave the album a positive review, noting Ai collaborated with more than 20 artists at the time of the release. CDJournal added, "Her [Ai's] voice overcomes genre barriers, capturing the essence of soul music.

Track listing 

 Hot Spot (feat. Uzi) – Ai
 Angel (feat. Ai) – Boy-Ken
 No Generation Gap (feat. Ai) – Char
 Welcome 2 Da Party (feat. Hi-D and Ai) – DJ Watarai
 Starstruck: "The Return of the LuvBytes" (feat. Ai, Emi Hinouchi and Rum of Heartsdales) – M-Flo
 Thunder Break (feat. Ai, Hab I Scream and Dabo) – Kaminari-Kazoku
 Rollin' On (Remix feat. Ai) – Double
 Super Back Shan (Yes, sir) [feat. Ai] – Dabo
 Gold Digga (feat. Ai) – Michico
 Jonan Ondo – Gicode
 Golden Mic (Remix feat. Kashi Da Handsome, Ai, Zeebra, Dohzi-T, and Han'nya)
 Fatal Attraction (feat. Ai) – 51-Goichi
 Uh Uh...... (feat. Ai) – Suite Chic
 Somebody's Girl – Ken Hirai
 Love Ya (feat. Ai) – Sphere of Influence
 Baby Shine – Heartsdales

Charts

References 

2004 compilation albums
Ai (singer) compilation albums
Island Records compilation albums
Universal Music Group compilation albums
Universal Sigma compilation albums